Christ Is Come is an album from Contemporary Christian/Rock band Big Daddy Weave. The album was released on September 22, 2009 through Fervent Records.

Accolades 

At the 41st GMA Dove Awards, Christ Is Come won a Dove Award for Christmas Album of the Year.

Chart performance 

The album peaked at #5 on Billboard's Holiday Albums.

Track listing

Personnel 

Big Daddy Weave
 Mike Weaver – lead and backing vocals, acoustic guitars, arrangements
 Jeremy Redmon – keyboards, electric guitars, drum programming, kazoo, backing vocals, arrangements 
 Joe Shirk – keyboards, saxophone, backing vocals 
 Jay Weaver – bass guitar
 Jeff Jones – drums

Additional Musicians
 Matt Gilder – keyboards
 Jimmy Olander – banjo, arrangements
 Ken Lewis – percussion 
 Matt Nelson – cello 
 Anna Redmon – backing vocals
 Toby Friesen – backing vocals, group vocals
 Conrad Johnson – backing vocals, group vocals
 Chris Kuti – backing vocals, group vocals
 David Leonard – backing vocals, group vocals

String Section and Arrangements
 David Angell
 Monisa Angell
 David Davidson 
 Saraghani Reist

Production 
 Jeremy Redmon – producer, engineer
 Ben Phillips – engineer 
 Jeff Quimby – engineer 
 Craig Alvin – mixing 
 Andrew Mendelson – mastering
 Natthapol Abhigantaphand – mastering assistant 
 Shelley Anderson – mastering assistant 
 Daniel Bacigalupi – mastering assistant 
 Katherine Petillo – creative director
 Roy Roper – design 
 Thomas Petillo – photography 
 Robin Geary – grooming

References

External links 
 Christ Is Come in Amazon.com

2009 Christmas albums
Christmas albums by American artists
Big Daddy Weave albums
Fervent Records albums
Rock Christmas albums